Homoeosoma nevadellum is a species of snout moth in the genus Homoeosoma. It was described by Roesler in 1965, and is known from Spain.

References

Moths described in 1965
Phycitini